Eddie DelGrosso (born August 27, 1985) is an American professional ice hockey player. He last played for the Las Vegas Wranglers of the ECHL. DelGrosso played collegiate hockey for the University of Nebraska-Omaha where he became the school's all-time leading scorer for defenceman.

Collegiate 
DelGrosso played four seasons with the University of Nebraska-Omaha. In his rookie season he was named to the All-CCHA Rookie Team. In his junior year he was named to the All-CCHA Second Team. In his senior year, DelGrosso became the school's all-time leading scorer for defenceman, surpassing Greg Zanon, and was named to the All-CCHA First Team. He signed a professional contract with the Springfield Falcons of the American Hockey League (AHL) on March 24, 2010.

Professional 
DelGrosso played eight games with the Falcons as they closed out their 2009–10 season. He then joined the HIFK in the Finnish Liiga for five games during the 2010–11 season. He was loaned to the Kiekko-Vantaa in Mestis for 13 games and HPK for two games before his contract was terminated in December 2010. Following his termination, DelGrosso joined the Las Vegas Wranglers in the ECHL.

On October 20, 2011, DelGrosso was placed on waivers by the Las Vegas Wranglers and was claimed by the Ontario Reign. However, DelGrosso instead joined the HYS The Hague of the top tier BeNe League. He helped the HYS The Hague win the Dutch Cup during the 2012–13 season.

Awards and honors

References

External links

1985 births
American men's ice hockey defensemen
HIFK (ice hockey) players
HPK players
Ice hockey people from Nevada
Indiana Ice players
Kiekko-Vantaa players
Las Vegas Wranglers players
Living people
Omaha Mavericks men's ice hockey players
Springfield Falcons players
St. Louis Heartland Eagles players